The 2016 Moldovan Super Cup was the 10th Moldovan Super Cup, an annual Moldovan football match played by the winner of the national football league (the National Division) and the winner of the national Cup. The match was played between Sheriff Tiraspol, champions of the 2015–16 National Division, and Zaria Bălți, winners of the 2015–16 Moldovan Cup. It was held at the Sheriff Small Arena on 10 August 2016.

Sheriff Tiraspol won the match 3–1.

Match

References

2016–17 in Moldovan football
CSF Bălți matches
FC Sheriff Tiraspol matches
Moldovan Super Cup